Hamburgh may refer to:

 An older English spelling of the German city of Hamburg, used up until the 19th century, from which the other meanings below are derived
 The former spelling of the town and village of Hamburg, New York
 The former name of Glenville, North Carolina
 A former town in Maryland where the Foggy Bottom neighborhood of Washington, D.C., now stands
 Black Hamburgh, another name for the German/Italian wine grape Trollinger
 Hamburg (chicken) or Hollandse Hoen, a Dutch chicken breed

See also 
 New Hamburg (disambiguation)